NLT Productions was an Australian production company formed in 1961 which made a number of films and TV series. It was founded in 1961 by Bobby Limb, Jack Neary and Les Tinker.

Select credits
Bobby Limb's Sound of Music (1963) - TV series
Divorce Court (1967) - TV series
The Rovers (1969–70) - TV series
Squeeze a Flower (1970) - film
Wake in Fright (1971) - film

See also

List of companies of Australia
List of film production companies
List of television production companies

References

External links
NLT Productions at IMDb
NLT Productions at National Film and Sound Archive
Record of papers held at State Library of New South Wales

Film production companies of Australia